"(Do The) Push and Pull (Part 1)" is a 1970 single on Stax Records by singer Rufus Thomas.   The song was written by Thomas, and the recording was arranged by Carl Hampton, and produced by Al Bell and Tom Nixon.

This was the first and only number-one song for Thomas, who had first hit the R&B chart in 1953. The song was at the top of the Billboard Best Selling Soul Singles chart for two weeks in February 1971. The single also reached the Top 30 on the pop chart, peaking at number 25.

Chart performance

References

1970 singles
Rufus Thomas songs
1970 songs
Stax Records singles